Foreign secretary may refer to:

 Foreign Secretary of the United Kingdom, the senior cabinet minister who heads the Foreign, Commonwealth and Development Office
 Foreign Secretary (Bangladesh), the senior civil servant in the Ministry of Foreign Affairs
 Foreign Secretary (India), the senior civil servant in the Ministry of External Affairs
 Foreign Secretary (Pakistan), the senior civil servant in the Ministry of Foreign Affairs
 Foreign Secretary (Sri Lanka), the Permanent Secretary in the Ministry of Foreign Affairs

See also
 Secretary of State (disambiguation)
 Foreign minister, generally a cabinet minister in charge of a nation's foreign affairs